The average Iraqi soldier is equipped with an assortment of uniforms ranging from the Desert Camouflage Uniform, the six color "Chocolate Chip" DBDU and the woodland pattern BDU to the US MARPAT or Jordanian KA7The Iraqi Special Forces, known as ISOF, also use Chinese PLA Type 03 camouflage and U.S. Multi cam.

Overview
Nearly all Iraqi military personnel have a PASGT ballistic helmet, generation I OTV ballistic vest and radios. Their light weapons consist of stocks of AKM and the German Heckler & Koch PSG1 sniper rifles, Type 56 assault rifles, American M16A2, M16A4 rifles and M4 carbines. Soviet PKM machineguns are still used by machine/support gunners and AT soldiers use RPG-7s.

Other
Weapons registration is poor. A 2006 report by the Special Inspector General for Iraq Reconstruction (SIGIR) notes that out of the 370,000 weapons turned over to the US since the fall of Saddam's regime, only 12,000 serial numbers have been recorded. The lack of proper accounting for these weapons makes the acquisition of small arms by anti-governmental forces or sectarian militias much easier.

References

Iraqi Ground Forces
Iraqi Armed Forces
Military equipment of Iraq